Jacaranda Music is a non-profit organization founded by impresario Patrick Scott and conductor/organist Mark Alan Hilt. Jacaranda produces an annual classical music concert series of modern music and works written since 2000, as well as rare older classical music with potential interest for contemporary listeners.  Jacaranda has been based in Santa Monica, California since 2003. In 2016, the series was named by L.A. Weekly as the Best Contemporary Classical Series. 

Throughout its 16 seasons, Jacaranda has presented the compositions of Philip Glass, John Cage, Olivier Messiaen, Gustav Mahler, Lou Harrison, Dylan Mattingly, Mark Grey, Florence Price, Lukas Foss, Julius Eastman, Frederic Rzewski, David Lang, Peter Maxwell Davies, Horatiu Radulescu, Franz Liszt and George Enescu, among many others. Musicians have included Grammy and Emmy winner Gloria Cheng, Anonymous 4, Quatuor Diotima, Scott Dunn, Kathleen Supové, Christopher Taylor, and Billy Childs.
Jacaranda's concerts have been reviewed by several publications, including the LA Times, Classical Voice North America, and BBC Music Magazine.  In 2018, The San Francisco Classical Voice said of Jacaranda: "To actually curate a concert is an art. It is one of the qualities that sets apart the Los Angeles music series Jacaranda. For more than 10 years… Jacaranda's concerts have been conceived as musical journeys of discovery…." The LA Times has said of Jacaranda that it "is known for imaginative programs of challenging contemporary music." 

Los Angeles Times music critic Mark Swed said of Jacaranda in 2013, "With demanding pieces by Eötvös and the famed late Hungarian composer György Ligeti, "Fierce Beauty" was the most ambitious undertaking so far and by far for Jacaranda.…With this concert, Jacaranda grew up, moving beyond local to national significance."

Longtime music critic Alan Rich regularly wrote about Jacaranda, saying that they produce, "a kind of personalized programming so that you leave each event with the sense of having visited some very smart programming."

Since 2011, the Lyris Quartet has been its resident ensemble.

Top 25 Most Programmed Composers

References

External links
 

Classical_music_concerts
Music_organizations
Contemporary_music_organizations
New_music_organizations
Music_of_Los_Angeles